The 2022–23 Grand Prix of Figure Skating Final and ISU Junior Grand Prix Final  was held from December 8–11, 2022  at the Torino Palavela in Turin, Italy. The combined event was the culmination of two international series — the Grand Prix of Figure Skating and the Junior Grand Prix. Medals were awarded in the disciplines of men's singles, women's singles, pair skating, and ice dance on the senior and junior levels. The previous Grand Prix Final in 2019 took place in Turin as well. The finals in 2020 and 2021 were cancelled due to the COVID-19 pandemic.

Schedule 
Listed in local time (UTC+1)

Qualifiers

Senior-level qualifiers

Junior-level qualifiers

Changes to preliminary qualifiers

Medals summary

Medalists

Senior

Junior

Medals table

Overall

Senior

Junior

Senior-level results

Men

Women

Pairs

Ice dance

Junior-level results

Men

Women

Pairs

Ice dance

References

External links 
 Results at isuresults.com

2022 in Italian sport
2022 in figure skating
Grand Prix of Figure Skating Final
ISU Junior Grand Prix
International figure skating competitions hosted by Italy
2022 in youth sport
Grand Prix of Figure Skating